El-Hadj is the fourth studio album by the Nigerian musician Remilekun Abdulkalid Safaru, known by his stage names Reminisce and ALAGA IBILE. The album feature artists such as 2face, Olamide, Seriki, 9ice, Ice Prince, Solidstar, and Mr Eazi, as well as collaborations with his label signees Sojay and Oladips.

Track listing

References

Reminisce (musician) albums
2016 albums